Thomas Coulson may refer to:

Thomas Coulson (rugby union) (1898–1948), English rugby union player
Thomas Coulson (MP) (1645–1713), English politician